The Government of East Pakistan or formerly Government of East Bengal governed the province East Bengal (later East Pakistan, now Bangladesh) and was centered in its provincial capital Dhaka. The head of the province was the Governor, who was nominated by the President of Pakistan. While the head of the province of East Pakistan was the Chief Minister who was elected by the East Pakistan Assembly.

The East Pakistani government was dominated by the Awami League. It was succeeded by the Government of Bangladesh following the province's secession in 1971.

Cabinets

Haque Ministry
Awami League accepted A.K. Fazlul Haque of Krishak Sramik Party as the Chief Minister of the province in the Parliamentary meeting on 2 April 1954, forced by Chaudhry Khaliquzzaman, the then governor of East Bengal, to form the provincial government. However, on the same day, without consulting the provincial council meeting, Haque announced three persons as ministers of the province according to his own wish. Awami League, the majority party of the United Front, could not accept this. 

On the 30th of the same month, Haque's speech in Calcutta, India highlighted the similarity between the two Bengals, which drew criticism in Pakistan. Under the pressure of criticism, Haque announced the names of 10 more ministers to improve relations with Awami League, 7 of whom were members of Awami League. However, on May 30, the central government dissolved the United Front cabinet and imposed Governor's rule in East Bengal.

Sarker Ministry
After the removal of Governor's rule on 5 June 1955, the Krishak Sramik Party and the Awami League formed the next cabinet. Although he announced his retirement from politics on 24 July 1954, on 11 August 1955 A.K. Fazlul Haque became the Home Minister and Abu Hussain Sarkar was the Chief Minister of the new cabinet. In the session of the Provincial Council dated 13 August 1956, Sheikh Mujibur Rahman moved a motion of no confidence against the Second United Front Cabinet. However, on August 14, when A.K. Fazlul Haque, Governor of East Pakistan, announced the suspension of the session of the Provincial Council for an indefinite period, the Awami League started a movement against the governor. 

On August 15, three cabinet ministers resigned. In the face of strong protests, the Governor convened a session of the East Pakistan Provincial Council on 26 August. On 4 September 1956, after East Pakistan Rifles fired at an Awami League rally, killing 4 people and injuring several others, protests broke out in Dhaka in response. In such a situation, Section 144 was issued and the leaders of Krishak Sramik Party went into hiding.

Khan Ministry
In view of the events of September 1956, the governor ordered the Awami League to form a cabinet. On 5 September 1956, the Awami League in East Pakistan formed the second ministry in the province. This ministry, which lasted for about two years, was abolished on 24 September 1958. At that time, Sheikh Mujibur Rahman was simultaneously a member of the working committee of Awami League and the Minister of Industries of East Pakistan, which was against the constitution of Awami League. So he resigned from the post of Minister of Industry. As Abdul Hamid Khan Bhashani resigned from Awami League and formed the National Awami Party, a section of Awami League members joined Bhasani's party. In March 1957, Governor Haque amended the law to reduce the no confidence vote from 130 to 104. 

On March 21, 1958, two days after 11 Awami League leaders left the party, the Abu Hossain government moved a motion of no confidence against the Khan cabinet. However, the no-confidence motion was rejected due to lack of sufficient votes.
AK Fazlul Haque dismissed the Khan cabinet and installed a new cabinet of the Abu Hussain Sarker on 31 March, but the Khan cabinet was reinstated on the same day after Haque was dismissed by Feroz Khan Noon's administration.
On 19 June 1958, Ataur Rahman Khan's cabinet fell due to a no-confidence motion.
Abu Hussain Sarker's ministry was ousted by a no-confidence vote on the day it formed the ministry on June 20.
After Ataur Rahman Khan's cabinet came to power, governor's rule was imposed in the province on June 25 for 2 months.

Governance
After absorption into the Dominion of Pakistan, the province of East Pakistan (former East Bengal) was administered by a ceremonial Governor and an indirectly elected Chief Minister. During the year from May 1954 to August 1955, executive powers were exercised by the Governor and there was no Chief Minister.

Governors

Chief Ministers

Legislature

East Pakistan's provincial assembly consisted of 300 members. It was known as the East Bengal Assembly from 1947 to 1955 when the provincial name was changed. The legislature was a successor to the Bengal Legislative Council and the Bengal Legislative Assembly, which were divided between East Bengal and West Bengal during the partition of Bengal in 1947. It was the largest provincial legislature in Pakistan.

Judiciary 

The High Court of judicature for East Bengal commonly known as the Dhaka High Court was established in 1947 under Pakistan (Provisional Constitutional) Order 1947 as a separate High Court with all Appellate, Civil and Original jurisdictions. In 1955 the Dhaka High Court became the High Court of East Pakistan and the Supreme Court of Pakistan was established as the apex Court with the appellate jurisdiction to hear the decisions of the High Courts established in the East and West Pakistan. Until 1967 the High Court was held in the building that now known as the Old High Court Building on Kazi Nazrul Islam Avenue, opposite the curzon hall, Dhaka. With the construction of a larger facility in the 1960s nearby that now houses the Supreme Court of Bangladesh and Attorney General's office, the High Court was shifted from Old House on 10 July 1967.

References

Citations

Bibliography

 

 
Provincial Governments of Pakistan
Politics of East Pakistan
Organisations based in Dhaka
1971 disestablishments in Pakistan
Post-independence history of Pakistan
1947 establishments in East Pakistan